The National Environment Commission (Conama) was created on 9 March 1994 after the releasing of the Law N°19,300 under the government of Patricio Aylwin. Its first CEO was José Goñi.

On 1 October 2010, President Sebastián Piñera transformed the commission in the Ministry for the Environment.

List of representatives

References

External links
 Profile at BCN

Government ministries of Chile